Beat Crazy is the third album by Joe Jackson, released in October 1980 and credited to the Joe Jackson Band. It was a relative disappointment commercially, peaking outside the Top 40 in both the UK and the United States, with its singles failing to chart. One reason for the reduced sales in the U.S. may have been that the group did not tour to support it there. Nevertheless, the Joe Jackson Band was successful and toured extensively. This would be the last studio album released by the Joe Jackson Band's original line-up until 2003's Volume 4.

Background
Beat Crazy was intended to be a stylistic departure from Jackson's first two albums but as he recalled, the band lacked a clear direction during the recording. Jackson later stated that he felt the record "didn't really work". He explained,

Musically, the album saw the band take in reggae and ska influence as seen on songs such as "In Every Dream Home", "Mad at You", and "Pretty Boys".

Track listing
All songs written, arranged and produced by Joe Jackson.

Personnel 
 Musicians
 Joe Jackson – vocals, keyboards, melodica
 Graham Maby – bass, vocals, lead vocal on "Beat Crazy"
 Gary Sanford – guitars
 David Houghton – drums, vocals

 Production
 Joe Jackson - arrangements, producer
 Norman Mighell - recording engineer
 Nigel Mills - assistant recording engineer
 Willy Smax - artwork
 Anton Corbijn - photography

Charts

References

External links 
 Beat Crazy album information at The Joe Jackson Archive

1980 albums
Joe Jackson (musician) albums
A&M Records albums